Antagarh is a town in the Kanker district located in the state of Chhattisgarh, India.

Demographics
As of the 2011 census, the town has a population of 6,777, of which 3,408 are male and 3,369 are female. There was a population increase of 32 percent since 2001, and the town had an 82 percent literacy rate.

History 
The fortress falling in the last of the princely state of Bastar, which is known as Antagarh.  The kings of Bastar used to come to the end of the princely state of Bastar and take cognizance, so there is also a king halt in Antagarh.  Tehsil was established here by the British around 1900.  After the bifurcation of Bastar district in 1998, Kanker was included in the district.

Transport 

Antagarh got connected with state capital Raipur through railways.

References

Villages in Kanker district